Henri Camille Sautot (5 May 1885 – 23 March 1963) was a French colonial governor.

Biography
Sautot was born in Bourbonne-les-Bains and attended school in Nancy. He studied at the Nancy-Université before carrying out national service.

Sautot became an Indigenous Affairs clerk in 1909, before becoming a colonial administrator in 1915. He was appointed chief of staff of the Governor of Dahomey in 1925, before becoming Acting Governor of St Pierre and Miquelon in 1929, serving until 1932. He was appointed Resident Commissioner of the New Hebrides in 1932, a post he held until becoming Acting Governor of Tahiti in 1935. He returned to his post in the New Hebrides in 1937.

Following the occupation of France in 1940, Sautot declared the New Hebrides' allegiance to the Free French on 20 July, the first territory to do so. On 13 September Charles de Gaulle appointed him Governor of New Caledonia. He sailed to New Caledonia and, greeted by large crowds on his arrival, went straight to Government House and removed Colonel Denis from office. He was made a companion of the Order of Liberation on 1 August 1941, later also becoming a Commander of the Legion of Honour and an Officer of the British Empire. However, after the new French High Commissioner in the Pacific Georges Thierry d'Argenlieu arrived in 1942, disagreements between the two led to Sautot being deported to Auckland in New Zealand in May 1942.

Later in 1942 Sautot was appointed Governor of Ubangi-Shari by de Gaulle, a post he held until retiring in 1946. He then returned to New Caledonia with his New Caledonian wife. He entered local politics, and served as mayor of Nouméa between 1947 and 1953.

Sautot died in a clinic in Nouméa in March 1963.

References

Further reading

1885 births
1963 deaths
Prefects of Saint Pierre and Miquelon
Resident Commissioners of the New Hebrides (France)
Governors of French Polynesia
Governors of New Caledonia
Mayors of Nouméa
Companions of the Liberation
Commandeurs of the Légion d'honneur
Officers of the Order of the British Empire
Governors of Ubangi-Shari
People from Haute-Marne
Nancy-Université alumni